David Farquharson  (17 November 1839 – 12 July 1907) was a Scottish painter.

Life
Farquharson was a Scottish landscape painter. He was born in Blairgowrie, Perthshire, and lived there until he moved to Edinburgh about 1872.  He was, to a great extent, a self-taught artist. He exhibited at the Royal Scottish Academy for the first time in 1868, and in 1882 was elected an associate, but in 1886 he settled in London until 1894.

He removed to Sennen Cove, Cornwall, but often revisited Scotland. His landscapes attracted considerable attention and he exhibited at the Royal Academy from 1877 to 1904. 
This led to his election as Associate in 1905 at the age of 66.

He painted the Highland hills and moors and peat mosses, river valleys and views in England and Holland, in all sorts of atmospheric conditions, in a tonal palette reminiscent of early Corot.

On 12 July 1907, he died at Balmore.

References

External links 
 
 Profile on Royal Academy of Arts Collections

1839 births
1907 deaths
People from Blairgowrie and Rattray
19th-century Scottish painters
Scottish male painters
20th-century Scottish painters
Associates of the Royal Academy
19th-century Scottish male artists
20th-century Scottish male artists